William Farr School, formally William Farr C of E Comprehensive School, is a Church of England academy school for 11 to 18-year-olds located within the town of Welton, Lincolnshire, England,  north-east of Lincoln, near the A46. Despite being a part of Welton, most of the school grounds are located in the civil parish of Dunholme.

History

Secondary modern school 
The school was opened as a secondary modern in 1952 on the site of RAF Dunholme Lodge, a Second World War Bomber Command station, which had been bought for £600 in 1946 by the Rev William Farr, vicar of Welton. The school was named after him when he died in 1955.

Comprehensive
The school acquired comprehensive status in 1972, whilst Brian Sawyer was the headmaster. It gained Grant Maintained status in 1992. This latter scheme was later abolished, but the school became a foundation school, a similar arrangement, in 1999.

In 2000, William Farr became a specialist Technology School.

In March 2003, the College Descartes-Montaigne from Liévin was due to send an exchange visit to the school, but this was cancelled due to all schools in the Pas-de-Calais department being told Britain was too dangerous to visit.

The school became a Science College in 2007.

The school became an independent academy in 2012. Head teacher Paul Strong, prior to his retirement in August 2011, stated he did not want to rename the school; it kept its full title, William Farr Church of England Comprehensive School.

William Farr is also an associate school of the University of Lincoln.

School performance

Before the school became an academy, Ofsted inspected and judged it as follows:

 2000: "a very good school, with many excellent features"
 2006: Outstanding
 2009: Outstanding
 2022: Good

In 2007, the school was a National Support School.

In 2001 William Farr had the best comprehensive school A-level results in England. In 2019, the school's Progress 8 benchmark at GCSE was above average. The proportion of its students entering the English Baccalaureate was low. 56% of children achieved Grade 5 or above in English and maths GCSEs, compared to 43% nationally. Progress at A level was below average and the average result was C+, the same as the national figure.

At least three currently serving staff members at the school have received awards. Helen Brittain, Head of History, received the 2008 Guardian award for teacher of the year at the East Midlands Conference Centre at the University of Nottingham. The award was also given to Elizabeth Hanson in 2011 and Christopher Mattley in 2015.

Paul Strong, head teacher 1986-2011, was awarded Head Teacher of the Year at the Commendation in the National Teaching Awards in 2009, the Ted Wragg Lifetime Achievement Award 2010, and an OBE in at the Queen's Diamond Jubilee Birthday Honours 2012.

School buildings

The old former wartime buildings were replaced in 1960. The sports hall was built in 1974, and the sixth form added in 1995. Queen Elizabeth II and Prince Philip visited the school on 14 October 1996 to open a new humanities building, named after Joseph Banks. There was a further building programme in the 2000s.

The Lawres Chapel was opened in 2004 by the then Bishop of Lincoln, John Saxbee. It is home to the Helen Alwyn memorial window and the RAF Book of Remembrance, which honours those who served and died during the Second World War and were stationed here at RAF Dunholme Lodge. Every day, members of Year 7 have the responsibility of turning a page. The chapel is always open and available to all members of the school of any faith or none.

The William Farr School Museum 
There were plans for an RAF museum on the site of a school in September 2015, with the curator of the planned RAF Dunholme Lodge Heritage Site former RAF intelligence officer and keen military historian Brian Riley. The project aims to create a museum to celebrate and preserve the history of RAF Dunholme Lodge, which inhabited the site before the school opened. The school had a special Nissen hut constructed at the school to house the artefacts it has collected over the last few years. A conservation specialist from Suffolk to advise the academy on how to best display and preserve the material they have. Foundations of many of the old RAF buildings were discovered the in William Farr Wood behind the school, planned to be used for an interpretive trail, with help from a woodland management team. The centre appealed for photographs and artefacts that may still be in the community.

Notable ex-pupils

Tracy Borman, historian and broadcaster
Martha Harris, footballer

References

External links 
 Official school website
 EduBase

Video clips
 Teachers TV

Educational institutions established in 1952
West Lindsey District
Church of England secondary schools in the Diocese of Lincoln
1952 establishments in England
Secondary schools in Lincolnshire
Academies in Lincolnshire